Cornwall Regional Airport  is located  east-northeast of the city of Cornwall, Ontario, Canada, across the St. Lawrence River from Massena, New York, United States. It has a single,  paved runway oriented east–west.

The airport is classified as an airport of entry by Nav Canada and is staffed by the Canada Border Services Agency (CBSA) on a call-out basis from the Three Nations Crossing. CBSA officers at this airport  can handle general aviation aircraft only, with no more than 15 passengers.

In November 2012, after negotiations with the airport commission, Canadian manufacturing company Bushcaddy Aircraft Canada moved its production to the airport and also accepted a contract to operate the UNICOM radio service.

References

External links
Page about this airport on COPA's Places to Fly airport directory
Cornwall Aviation

Registered aerodromes in Ontario
Buildings and structures in Cornwall, Ontario
Transport in Cornwall, Ontario